Cypecore is a German melodic death metal band from Mannheim. They were formed in 2007 and have released four independent studio albums. All of these were conceptual albums based upon a narrative of futuristic, post-apocalyptic warfare, set in a hypothetical 22nd century. The band describe their musical style as "brutal, martial but still melodic", and refer to their own live performances as military "operations".

Band members

Current line-up 
 Dominic Christoph – vocals
 Nils Lesser – guitar

Previous members 
 Chris Heckel – bass
 Evan K – guitar
 Attila Erdélyi – vocals
 Lucas Amadeus Buttendorf – drums
 Christoph Rogdakis – guitar
 Tobias Derer – drums
 Jay Marsman – guitar

Discography

Studio albums 
 Innocent (2008)
 Take the Consequence (2010)
 Identity (2016)
 The Alliance (2018)

Singles 
 "The Hills Have Eyes" (2014)
 "My Confession" (2014)
 "Identity"  (2015)
 "The Alliance"  (2018)
 "Dissatisfactory" (2018)
 "Chosen Chaos" (2021)
 "Spirals" (2022)

References

External links 
 

German musical groups
Melodic death metal
Industrial metal
Musical groups established in 2007
2007 establishments in Germany